Barkston Ash was a parliamentary constituency centred on the village of Barkston Ash in the West Riding of Yorkshire (now part of West Yorkshire and North Yorkshire). It was represented in the House of Commons of the Parliament of the United Kingdom from 1885 until 1983. It elected one Member of Parliament (MP) by the first past the post system of election.

History 

The constituency was created under the Redistribution of Seats Act 1885, and in the main returned Conservative MPs at every general election until its abolition. However, it was briefly represented by the Liberal Joseph Andrews, who won the seat at a by-election in October 1905 after the death of its first MP, Sir Robert Gunter. The Conservatives regained the seat at the 1906 general election.

At the 1983 general election, Barkston Ash was replaced by the Selby constituency. As of the 2010 general election, the modern equivalent of Barkston Ash is Selby and Ainsty.

Boundaries 

The Redistribution of Seats Act 1885 provided that the constituency was to consist of-
the Sessional Divisions of-
Lower Barkston Ash
Skyrack (except so much as is comprised in the Osgoldcross and Pudsey Divisions)
Upper Barkston Ash (except so much as is comprised in the Osgoldcross Division)
Wetherby (except the Parishes (which are in the Wapentake of the Ainsty of York) of Tockwith, Bickerton, Thorpe Arch, Bilton, and Walton), and
the Parishes of Grimston, Kirkby Wharf with North Milford, Newton Kyme with Toulston, Stutton with Hazlewood, Tadcaster West, Towton and Ulleskelf.

1918–1950: The Urban Districts of Garforth and Selby, the Rural Districts of Bishopthorpe, Selby, Tadcaster, and Wetherby, and in the Rural District of Great Ouseburn the parishes of Acomb, Hessay, Knapton, Moor Monkton, Nether Poppleton, Rufforth, and Upper Poppleton.

1950–1983: The Urban Districts of Garforth and Selby, the Rural Districts of Selby and Wetherby, the Rural District of Tadcaster except the parishes of Great and Little Preston, and Swillington, and in the Rural District of Nidderdale the parishes of Hessay, Knapton, Moor Monkton, Nether Poppleton, Rufforth, and Upper Poppleton.

Members of Parliament

Elections

Elections in the 1880s

Elections in the 1890s

Elections in the 1900s

Elections in the 1910s 

General Election 1914–15:

Another General Election was required to take place before the end of 1915. The political parties had been making preparations for an election to take place and by the July 1914, the following candidates had been selected; 
Unionist: George Lane-Fox
Liberal:

Elections in the 1920s

Elections in the 1930s

Election in the 1940s

Elections in the 1950s

Elections in the 1960s

Elections in the 1970s

See also
List of parliamentary constituencies in North Yorkshire
List of parliamentary constituencies in West Yorkshire

References 

Parliamentary constituencies in Yorkshire and the Humber (historic)
Constituencies of the Parliament of the United Kingdom established in 1885
Constituencies of the Parliament of the United Kingdom disestablished in 1983
Politics of North Yorkshire
History of North Yorkshire